The Litang–Zhanjiang railway or Lizhan railway, is a railroad in southern China from Litang Township in the Guangxi Autonomous Region on the Hunan–Guangxi railway, to the port city of Zhanjiang, in Guangdong Province, on the South China Sea. Major cities and towns along the route include Guigang, Xingye County, Yulin (Guangxi), Luchuan, Lianjiang (Guangdong), Suixi (Guangdong) and Zhanjiang.

History
The Litang–Zhanjiang railway was planned from 1952 to 1953 and built from September 25, 1954 to July 1, 1955.  A  spur line from the Hechun Station to Maoming was completed in 1959 and now connects the Lizhan Line with the Guangzhou–Maoming railway. From 2005 to 2009, the southernmost section of the Lizhan Line from Hechun Station to Zhanjiang,  in length, was double-tracked and electrified to accommodate trains running at speeds of up to 140 km/h.  The Guigang to Yulin section of the line,  in length, has been double-tracked and underwent capacity expansion from 2013 to 2015 to accommodate trains running at speeds of up to 160 km/h to 200 km/h. The project is complete for the Guigang–Yulin section, and the EMU train entered operation in the end of 2016.

Rail connections
 Litang: Hunan–Guangxi railway, Litang–Qinzhou railway
 Yulin: Luoyang–Zhanjiang railway 
 Hechun station: Hechun–Maoming railway
 Zhanjiang: Guangdong–Hainan railway

Incident
On 1 July 2008, a passenger train hit a landslide which caused the locomotive and six carriages to derail. Seven people were injured.

See also

 List of railways in China

References

Railway lines in China
Railway lines opened in 1955
Rail transport in Guangxi
Rail transport in Guangdong